Acratosaura mentalis, Amaral's colobosaura, is a species of lizard in the family Gymnophthalmidae. It is endemic to Brazil.

References

Acratosaura
Reptiles described in 1933
Taxa named by Afrânio Pompílio Gastos do Amaral